Tracinda Corporation is an American private investment corporation that was owned by the late Kirk Kerkorian.  Its major investments included a minority interest of MGM Resorts International.  Tracinda is headquartered in Las Vegas, Nevada.  The company was named after Kerkorian's daughters, Tracy and Linda.

History
Tracinda formerly owned ten percent of General Motors; it sold all of its stock in November 2006.

Tracinda offered $4.5 billion to buy Chrysler on April 5, 2007, causing the shares of DaimlerChrysler to soar 5.3%. Ultimately, the bid failed and Chrysler was sold to Cerberus Capital Management.

Kerkorian also bid, unsuccessfully, in 1995 to take over Chrysler.

On May 16, 2008, Tracinda contacted Ford shareholders in a bid to buy 20,000,000 shares by June 4, 2008, at a rate of $8.50 a share. Later on, the bid was processed, and the company bought the shares through Ahmed Adnan, an investor.

On Oct 20, 2008, Tracinda sold more than 7 million shares of Ford at an average price of roughly $2.44 a share.

On Dec 29, 2008, Tracinda sold his remaining shares in Ford Motor Company.

In May 2009, following the completion of a $1 billion stock offering by MGM Mirage, Kerkorian and Tracinda lost their majority ownership of the gaming company, dropping from 53.8 percent to 39 percent and, even after pledging to purchase 10 percent of the new stock offering, they became minority owners.

Kerkor "Kirk" Kerkorian died June 15, 2015, aged 98.

On September 16, 2019, MGM Resorts announced that Tracinda informed the company that it had disposed of its stake in the resort company following instructions left in Kerkorian's Will that upon his death Tracinda was supposed to dispose of its interest in the resort company in a timely manner.

References

Companies based in Los Angeles County, California